Lepisanthes is a genus of 24 or 25 species of trees or shrubs native to tropical  Africa, south and southeast Asia,  Australia, and Madagascar.

It includes species formerly classified in the genera Aphania, Erioglossum, and Otophora.

Species include:

Lepisanthes alata
Lepisanthes amoena
Lepisanthes basicardia
Lepisanthes browniana
Lepisanthes cauliflora
Lepisanthes chrysotricha
Lepisanthes fruticosa
Lepisanthes hainanensis
Lepisanthes multijuga
Lepisanthes oligophylla
Lepisanthes perrieri
Lepisanthes rubiginosa
Lepisanthes sambiranensis
Lepisanthes senegalensis
Lepisanthes tetraphylla
Lepisanthes unilocularis

References

External links

 
Sapindaceae genera